The Peoria Riverfront Museum is a private museum of art, science, history, and achievement located on the riverfront in downtown Peoria, Illinois in a building owned by the County of Peoria. The Museum has five major galleries and a dozen smaller display spaces for rotating exhibitions. It is also known for its 40-ft. dome Digistar 7 planetarium, and for film screenings on a 70 ft. flat screen, the largest in Illinois. 

Exhibition partners include philanthropist Alice Walton's Art Bridges foundation, the American Museum of Natural History, the Smithsonian, and the Whitney Museum of American Art with special emphasis on its cultural partnerships with New York institutions. Permanent displays include the Center for American Decoys, "Bronzeville to Harlem: An American Story", the Duryea Experience, and other items in the Museum's 18,000-object collection, which is constantly being rotated for guests. The museum opened its 87,000 Sq. ft. building on October 20, 2012 as the successor to Peoria's Lakeview Museum of Arts & Sciences, established in 1965.

Description
The museum's collections include fine art (paintings, sculptures, works on paper), decorative art (furniture, ceramics, metal, glass, textiles), folk art (paintings, sculptures, graphics, decorative arts, etc.), ethnographic art (Native American, African, Oceanic, Asian), natural science artifacts (rocks and minerals, insects, shells), and historic artifacts including a Duryea Motor Wagon Company car, theater and opera posters, and square dancing items. The museum also owns a significant collection of folk art wildfowl decoy carvings.

The world's third largest scale model of the solar system is centered on the museum, which has a  diameter representation of the Sun. The full model includes 5 dwarf planets and a number of comets around the globe.

The museum building is adjacent to the historic Rock Island Depot and Freight House.

Development
The Peoria Riverfront Museum opened on October 20, 2012 as a successor to the Lakeview Museum of Arts and Sciences, which had been founded by private citizens in 1965 as the Lakeview Center and whose building was then given to and maintained by the Peoria Park District while its operations remained entirely private. Lakeview Museum was located in the north central suburban Lakeview Park in Peoria. It was also home to more than 50 member clubs, hobby groups, and organizations who formed an independent arts and sciences council whose members had helped start the museum.

Lakeview Museum officials led the campaign for the new museum, and its collections, trustees and staff formed the foundation of the Peoria Riverfront Museum operation when it opened.

The Peoria Riverfront Museum was funded by private contributions with support from donated land by the city of Peoria and support for the building by a tax referendum approved by voters of Peoria County. The operations are supported by donations and earned revenue while the building and grounds are owned by Peoria County and leased to the museum by public-private partnership agreement.  Key to the agreement was the enactment by local voters of a supplemental sales tax.  An admission fee is charged to museum nonmembers. The museum has had more than 1.1 million visitors since its opening.

References

Museums in Peoria County, Illinois
Art museums and galleries in Illinois
Buildings and structures in Peoria, Illinois
Museums established in 2012
Planetaria in the United States
Natural history museums in Illinois
Tourist attractions in Peoria, Illinois
2012 establishments in Illinois
Illinois River